Commack Union Free School District is a public school district located in Suffolk County, New York, United States. The school district straddles the towns of Huntington and Smithtown, with Townline Road as the dividing line. It serves the residents of Commack as well as parts of Dix Hills, Smithtown and East Northport. It served approximately 6,000 students during the 2018–2019 school year. There are four primary schools (grades K–2), two intermediate schools (grades 3–5), one middle school (grades 6–8) and one high school (grades 9–12).

Schools

Primary schools
The primary schools in the Commack School District are Indian Hollow, Rolling Hills, North Ridge, and Wood Park. They serve students in grades K–2. The school day for these schools last from around 9:20 AM to 3:20 PM although one should check with the specific schools for exact times. The students have one teacher throughout the day except for special classes like music, art, and physical education and special services like speech, physical, or occupational therapy.

Intermediate schools
The intermediate schools are Burr and Sawmill. They serve students in grades 3–5. Their school day is from 8:50 AM to 3:05 PM. The two buildings are identical in their structure and design. Both schools have at least ten clubs that meet while school is not in session. The children have one teacher for the whole day except for special classes like music, art and physical education. There are many special services available like Physical Speech and Occupational Therapy, social workers, psychologists and a gifted and talented program. There is also an English as a second language program. In fourth grade, the students begin to learn a musical instrument. They are given lessons once a week and participate in the school's band or orchestra. There is a chorus for students who are interested in singing. Each fifth grade class in both schools takes a two-day trip to Camp Mariah in Fishkill, NY towards the end of the year.

Middle school
The Commack Middle School serves students in grades 6–8. The school day lasts from 7:50 AM to 2:38 PM. Commack Middle School is the first school with multiple classes held in different rooms, unlike in the intermediate and primary schools. Each period is 41 minutes for the exception of 9th period (43 minutes). The students have 9 periods per day, each with a different teacher. Each child is required to take Math, English, Science, Social Studies, a foreign language, and Physical Education all year for the entire three years. They are also required to take Art, Family and Consumer Science, Technology and Health for a quarter of each year. There are 65 clubs and 20 sports teams for students.

High school

The Commack High School serves students in grades 9–12. The school day lasts from 7:30 AM to 2:25 PM. The students have nine periods per day, each with a different teacher. The classes are forty minutes in length with 5 minutes of walking time in between them. Each student is required to meet the requirements for a New York State Regents diploma unless there are special circumstances. They are also required to complete 15 CSIP (Community Service Involvement Program) credits their first three years and 20 their senior year. These can be fulfilled by participating in sports and clubs or by doing volunteer work inside or out of school. Commack High School is an International Baccalaureate School, and students pursuing an IB diploma are subject to a more stringent of requirements. As of 2018 there were 15 honor societies, 52 clubs and 21 sports teams for students.

As of the 2019-2020 school year, the total enrollment was 2,187 students and 168 teachers. The student to teacher ratio was 13.07%.

In 2012, U.S. News & World Report ranked Commack High School the best high school in Suffolk County, the third best on Long Island, the 18th best in New York state, and the 95th best in the country. As of 2018, Commack High School is unranked in New York State.

List of current and former schools

Board of Education

Academics

Commack Middle School was awarded first place in the Long Island Regional Middle School Science Bowl academic competition at Brookhaven National Laboratory on April 14, 2007, and went on to take seventh place in the academic competition in the National Middle School Science Bowl that same year. The Commack Middle School also won the Long Island Regional Middle School Science Bowl in March of 2012, March 2014 and in March of 2016.

Commack High School was recognized as a National Blue Ribbon school of excellence in 2021.

The Suffolk County Reading Council has recognized the Commack School District's elementary schools for their achievements in the area of literacy.

Demographics 
The tables below describe the school district's demographic data for the last three school years that have been made available by the New York State Education Department.

Notable alumni
Carly Aquilino, standup comedian and TV personality (Girl Code)
Dave Cohen, college football coach
Bob Costas, sportscaster
Don DeMola, MLB pitcher, Montreal Expos
Courtney Galiano, dancer
Adam Gertler, TV personality (FX Movie Download) and chef (Gertler's Wurst)
Pete Harnisch, Major League Baseball player
Jennifer Iacopelli, Author
Tom Mendoza, business executive, namesake of Mendoza College of Business at Notre Dame
Tim Miller (Bizzle), professional Fortnite player for FaZe Clan
Dianne Moritz, author
Steve Morrison, co-host of Preston and Steve radio show
Rosie O'Donnell, entertainer
Samantha Prahalis, WNBA basketball player
 Ashley Reyes, actress and star of The CW revival of the TV series Walker (TV series)
Ruth Ann Swenson, opera singer

References

External links
 Commack School District website

Huntington, New York
Smithtown, New York
School districts in New York (state)
Education in Suffolk County, New York
Schools in Suffolk County, New York
School districts established in 1899